A bandage is a piece of material used either to support a medical device such as a dressing or splint, or on its own to provide support to or to restrict the movement of a part of the body. When used with a dressing, the dressing is applied directly on a wound, and a bandage used to hold the dressing in place. Other bandages are used without dressings, such as elastic bandages that are used to reduce swelling or provide support to a sprained ankle. Tight bandages can be used to slow blood flow to an extremity, such as when a leg or arm is bleeding heavily.

Bandages are available in a wide range of types, from generic cloth strips to specialized shaped bandages designed for a specific limb or part of the body. Bandages can often be improvised as the situation demands, using clothing, blankets or other material. In American English, the word bandage is often used to indicate a small gauze dressing attached to an adhesive bandage.

Types

Gauze bandage (common gauze roller bandage)
The most common type of bandage is the gauze bandage, a woven strip of material with a Telfa absorbent barrier to prevent adhering to wounds. A gauze bandage can come in any number of widths and lengths and can be used for almost any bandage application, including holding a dressing in place.

Adhesive bandage

Liquid bandage

Compression bandage

The term 'compression bandage' describes a wide variety of bandages with many different applications.

Short stretch compression bandages are applied to a limb (usually for treatment of lymphedema or venous ulcers). This type of bandage is capable of shortening around the limb after application and is therefore not exerting ever-increasing pressure during inactivity. This dynamic is called resting pressure and is considered safe and comfortable for long-term treatment. Conversely, the stability of the bandage creates a very high resistance to stretch when pressure is applied through internal muscle contraction and joint movement. This force is called working pressure.

Long stretch compression bandages have long stretch properties, meaning their high compressive power can be easily adjusted. However, they also have a very high resting pressure and must be removed at night or if the patient is in a resting position.

Triangular bandage

Also known as a cravat bandage, a triangular bandage is a piece of cloth put into a right-angled triangle, and often provided with safety pins to secure it in place. It can be used fully unrolled as a sling, folded as a normal bandage, or for specialized applications, as on the head. One advantage of this type of bandage is that it can be makeshift and made from a fabric scrap or a piece of clothing. The Boy Scouts popularized use of this bandage in many of their first aid lessons, as a part of the uniform is a "neckerchief" that can easily be folded to form a cravat.

Tube bandage
A tube bandage is applied using an applicator, and is woven in a continuous circle. It is used to hold dressings or splints on to limbs, or to provide support to sprains and strains, so that it stops bleeding.

Kirigami bandage

A new type of bandage was invented in 2016; inspired by the art of kirigami, it uses parallel slits to better fit areas of the body that bend. The bandages have been produced with 3D-printed molds.

See also
Bandage scissors
Tulle gras
Compression stockings
Field dressing (bandage)
Dressing (medical)

References

External links

Use of Paper Dressings for Wounds, Popular Science monthly, February 1919, page 68, Scanned by Google Books: https://books.google.com/books?id=7igDAAAAMBAJ&pg=PA68
A Mechanical Helper for the Red Cross, Popular Science monthly, February 1919, page 74, Scanned by Google Books: https://books.google.com/books?id=7igDAAAAMBAJ&pg=PA74

Medical dressings